3-coloring may refer to:

 Fox n-coloring, in knot theory, a method of colouring knots or links
 Tricolorability, in knot theory, the property of being represented by three colours
 Graph coloring, in graph theory, the colouring of the vertices of a graph